Dešat or Deshat is a mountain on the border between Albania and North Macedonia. The mountain is characterised by its steep peaks: Mal and Golem Krčin and Velivar. Other significant peaks are: Deli Senica, and Suva Bara. Dešat also has deep river gorges, immense forests, and small glacial mountain lakes. The nearest town from the Albanian side is Peshkopi and from the Macedonian side is Debar.

References

Two-thousanders of North Macedonia
Two-thousanders of Albania
Albania–North Macedonia border
International mountains of Europe
Geography of Dibër County